= HD 125040 =

Visual binary star system in the constellation Boötes

Observation data Epoch J2000 Equinox ICRS
- Constellation: Boötes
- A
- Right ascension: 14^{h} 16^{m} 32.84325^{s}
- Declination: +20° 07′ 18.6542″
- Apparent magnitude (V): 6.41
- B
- Right ascension: 14^{h} 16^{m} 32.97162^{s}
- Declination: +20° 07′ 14.6100″
- Apparent magnitude (V): 8.33

Characteristics
- Spectral type: F8V
- B−V color index: +0.488

Astrometry
Absolute magnitude (M_{V})	3.68

A
Radial velocity (R_{v})	−6.90±0.47 km/s
Proper motion (μ)	RA: −135.348 mas/yr Dec.: −95.322 mas/yr
Parallax (π)	30.2106±0.0226 mas
Distance	107.96 ± 0.08 ly (33.10 ± 0.02 pc)

B
Proper motion (μ)	RA: −125.557 mas/yr Dec.: −87.056 mas/yr
Parallax (π)	30.2246±0.0243 mas
Distance	107.91 ± 0.09 ly (33.09 ± 0.03 pc)

Orbit
Period (P)	956.6±299.4 yr
Semi-major axis (a)	3.75±0.75" (122.3±24.4 AU)
Eccentricity (e)	0.53±0.08
Inclination (i)	134.3±6.9°
Longitude of the node (Ω)	14.1±10.4°
Periastron epoch (T)	1683.9±14.2
Argument of periastron (ω) (secondary)	72.2±18.5°

Details

A
Mass	1.2 M_{☉}
Radius	1.3 R_{☉}
Luminosity	2.4 L_{☉}
Surface gravity (log g)	4.22 cgs
Temperature	6,326 K
Metallicity [Fe/H]	−0.31 dex
Rotational velocity (v sin i)	35.9 km/s
Age	2.5 Gyr

B
Mass	0.86 M_{☉}
Radius	0.81 R_{☉}
Luminosity	0.42 L_{☉}
Surface gravity (log g)	4.53 cgs
Temperature	5,260 K
Metallicity [Fe/H]	−0.17 dex
Age	5.2 Gyr

Other designations
- BD+20°2954, HD 125040, HIP 69751, HR 5346, SAO 83259, WDS J14165+2007AB

Database references
SIMBAD	data
- A
- B

HD 125040 is a visual binary star system in the northern constellation of Boötes. It appears as a dim point of light near the lower limit of perception with the naked eye, having a combined apparent visual magnitude of 6.25. The system is located at a distance of approximately 106 light years from the Sun based on parallax measurements, but is drifting closer with a radial velocity of −7 km/s. It has a high proper motion, traversing the celestial sphere at an angular rate of 0.164 arcseconds yr^{−1}.

This was first reported to be a double by J. F. W. Herschel in 1830. The stars orbit each other with a semi-major axis of 122 AU, a period of roughly 956.6 years, and an eccentricity of 0.53. They have a combined mass about double that of the Sun. The combined spectral type is of an F-type main-sequence star with a stellar classification of F8V; the brighter primary star has a spectral class of F6V. The system is a source for X-ray emission.
